Tim Rabbitt was Mayor of County Galway from 2003 to 2004.

External links
 http://www.emigrant.ie/index.php?option=com_content&task=view&id=37846&Itemid=430
 http://www.emigrant.ie/index.php?option=com_content&task=view&id=23981
 http://www.westernpeople.ie/news/kfidcwojoj/
 http://www.westontrack.com/news72.htm

Living people
Politicians from County Galway
Fianna Fáil politicians
Local councillors in County Galway
Year of birth missing (living people)